Libor Kovařík (born 23 February 1976) is a former  Czech football referee. He has been a full international for FIFA since 2006.

Kovařík served as a referee in 2010 World Cup qualifiers.

Career statistics
Statistics for Gambrinus liga matches only.

References

External links
Libor Kovařík on WorldReferee.com
Libor Kovařík on rozhodci-cmfs.cz
Libor Kovařík on weltfussball.de 

1976 births
Living people
Czech football referees